Rajendra Singh Bidhuri (born 14 May 1961) is a Member of the Rajasthan Legislative Assembly and a member of the Indian National Congress (INC).  
He is currently the Member of Legislative Assembly representing Begun (Vidhan Sabha constituency). He also served as a Parliamentary secretary during 2008-12 in Rajasthan Legislative Assembly and In an unexpected move, resigned from  parliamentary secretary post in 2012 to press the government to meet the Gurjar agitation demand for 5% quota in jobs and educational institutes.

References 

Living people
1961 births
Members of the Rajasthan Legislative Assembly
Indian politicians
Indian National Congress politicians from Rajasthan